The Essential Run-D.M.C is a two-disc compilation album by American hip hop group Run-DMC, released on October 30, 2012. It is a part of Sony BMG's Essential series of compilation albums and includes selections from Run-DMC's back catalog from 1983 through 2001.

Track listing

Disc one

Disc two

Release history

References 

Run-DMC albums
2012 compilation albums
Sony Music compilation albums
Legacy Recordings compilation albums
Arista Records compilation albums